Lonnie Smith may refer to:

 Lonnie Smith (baseball) (born 1955), American baseball player
 Lonnie Smith (boxer) (born 1962), American boxer
 Lonnie Smith (organist) (1942–2021), American organist
 Lonnie Liston Smith (born 1940), American jazz, soul, and funk pianist
 The plaintiff of Smith v. Allwright, landmark decision of the U.S. Supreme Court regarding voting rights and racial desegregation